Don Carlos is a (historical) tragedy in five acts by Friedrich Schiller; it was written between 1783 and 1787 and first produced in Hamburg in 1787. The title character is Carlos, Prince of Asturias and the play as a whole is loosely modeled on historical events in the 16th century under the reign of King Philip II of Spain. Don Carlos is a Prince of Spain, given to the Inquisition by his father, who also wants to marry his lover, for his Libertarian creeds. Another great Romantic character is the Marquis of Posa dying for the liberty of Hollandaise Provinces as well as ruling Catholic Spain during Reformation and Counter-Reformation.

Contents
In 1982, Lesley Sharpe argued that with Don Carlos, Schiller moved away from character-based drama, and that the play's universe "casts a shadow of ambiguity" on its characters because of the complexity of the situation.

Reception
According to Schiller himself, the two main criticisms of Don Carlos were that it lacked unity and that the actions of the Marquis Posa were implausible. In Briefe über Don Carlos (1788), he himself claimed that two acts is too little time for a gradual development of Philip's trust in Posa. Schiller did defend Posa's actions with arguments from character.

Rudiger Gorner claimed in Standpoint that Kenneth Tynan once criticized Don Carlos as "a Spanish tragedy composed of themes borrowed from Hamlet and Phèdre", though according to The Guardian's Michael Billington, Tynan was actually writing about Schiller's play Mary Stuart (1800) after seeing a 1958 performance of that work at The Old Vic. Sharpe claimed that Schiller's defenses of Posa are unsuccessful because the play is not character-based in the first place, though she also said that Schiller's overall discussion of the play ultimately does "less than justice [...] to the play as a work of art". Gorner argued that the "sheer musicality of Schiller's verse" is shown by such works as Don Carlos, as well as The Robbers (1781) and Intrigue and Love (1784).

Opera adaptations
Several operas have been composed on the basis of the play:
 1844 opera by Michael Costa (libretto Leopold Tarentini, London)
 1847 opera by Pasquale Bona (libretto Giorgio Giacchetti, Milan)
 1850 opera by Antonio Buzzolla (libretto Francesco Maria Piave, Venice) (this version was entitled "Elisabetta di Valois")
 1862 opera by Vincenzo Moscuzza (libretto Leopold Tarentini, Naples)
 1867 & 1884 Don Carlos and Don Carlo by Giuseppe Verdi (libretto Joseph Méry & Camille du Locle, Paris, Italian translation by Achille de Lauzières and Angelo Zanardini, Milan; German translation by Julius Kapp and Kurt Soldan)

English translations and stage adaptations

 Reprint of an 1872 translation.
 Reprint of a 1996 translation (out-of-print).
 Poulton's adaptation was directed by Michael Grandage in a well-reviewed staging. 
 MacDonald's adaptation was first staged in Edinburgh in 1995. It is a verse translation in iambic pentameter; Mary Carole McCauley wrote, "MacDonald creates a sense of ease within his 10-syllable metric lines by using modern idioms, and what the translation lacks in a certain lush richness, it may make up for in accessibility."

Influence on English-language literature and film
Jeffrey L. High (CSULB) has found influences of Schiller's plays on the screenplays for several Hollywood films, and in particular suggests a close correspondence between Don Carlos and the screenplay for Star Wars (1977).

See also

Cultural depictions of Philip II of Spain

Further reading
 Review of a 2004 production in Sheffield, England of Mike Poulton's adaptation from the German, along with an extended discussion of the play's history.
University of Oxford production of Don Carlos at the Oxford Playhouse, 18–21 Feb. 2009

Notes

References

External links 
 

1787 plays
Plays adapted into operas
Plays by Friedrich Schiller
Cultural depictions of Fernando Álvarez de Toledo, 3rd Duke of Alba